Modern pentathlon at the 2014 Asian Games was held in Dream Park, Incheon, South Korea between 2 and 3 October 2014.

Schedule

Medalists

Men

Women

Medal table

Participating nations
A total of 43 athletes from 6 nations competed in modern pentathlon at the 2014 Asian Games:

References

External links
Schedule and result

 
2014 Asian Games events
2014
Asian Games
2014 Asian Games